Cleome maculata is a species of cleome that is native to southern Africa, where it occurs in sandy soils, especially in rocky habitats, and on slopes. It is a mostly annual plant, which is found in highveld regions of medium rainfall in South Africa, Botswana and Namibia. It is an erect and simple or branching plant, usually less than a foot tall, with sparse leaves. The linear leaflets are three to five compound. Two of the up-curved, mauve flower petals have a yellow mark at their center, which is bordered with dark purple. The long, up-curved stamens are tipped with bluish, knobby anthers. The fruit is a linear capsule. The species is a pioneer plant that may become a weed.

References

maculata